The 2017–18 Formosa Dreamers season was the franchise's 1st season, its first season in the ASEAN Basketball League (ABL), its 1st in Changhua County. The Dreamers are coached by Hsu Hao-Cheng in his first year as head coach. The Dreamers play their home games at Changhua County Stadium.

Standings

Roster

Game log

Regular season 

|- style="background:#fcc;"
| 1
| November 18
| @Knights
| L 73-94
| Jaleel Cousins (22)
| Jaleel Cousins (15)
| Lenny Daniel (3)
| GOR Kertajaya Surabaya
| 0-1
|- style="background:#fcc;"
| 2
| November 24
| @Kung Fu
| L 59-86
| Lenny Daniel (18)
| Lenny Daniel (15)
| James Forrester (4)
| Nanhai Gymnasium
| 0-2

|- style="background:#cfc;"
| 3
| December 9
| @Heat
| W 80-75
| Lenny Daniel (22)
| Lenny Daniel (19)
| Cheng Chi-Kuan (3)
| CIS Arena
| 1-2
|-style="background:#fcc;"
| 4 
| December 16 
| Alab 
| L 61-78 
| Lenny Daniel (19) 
| Jaleel Cousins (9) 
| Chou Tzu-Hua (3) 
| Changhua County Stadium 
| 1-3
|-style="background:#fcc;"
| 5 
| December 17 
| Eastern 
| L 97-120 
| Lenny Daniel (18) 
| Lenny Daniel (11) 
| Chou Tzu-Hua (6) 
| Changhua County Stadium 
| 1-4

|-style="background:#fcc;"
| 6 
| January 6 
| Heat 
| L 85-99 
| Wu Sung-Wei (21) 
| Chukwunike Okosa (10) 
| Lenny Daniel (5) 
| Changhua County Stadium 
| 1-5
|-style="background:#fcc;"
| 7 
| January 7 
| Vampire 
| L 84-104 
| Chen Yu-Han (18) 
| Lenny Daniel (8) 
| Yang Tian-You (5) 
| Changhua County Stadium 
| 1-6
|-style="background:#fcc;"
| 8 
| January 14 
| @Dragons 
| L 74-84 
| Ronnie Aguilar (22) 
| Ronnie Aguilar (22) 
| Chou Tzu-Hua (4) 
| MABA Stadium 
| 1-7
|-style="background:#fcc;"
| 9 
| January 18 
| @Eastern 
| L 79-99 
| Lenny Daniel (19) 
| Ronnie Aguilar (16) 
| Yang Tian-You (6) 
| Southorn Stadium 
| 1-8
|-style="background:#fcc;"
| 10 
| January 24 
| @Vampire 
| L 85-93 
| Lenny Daniel (32) 
| Lenny Daniel (14) 
| Chou Tzu-Hua (5) 
| Stadium 29 
| 1-9
|-style="background:#fcc;"
| 11 
| January 27 
| Kung Fu 
| L 77-88 
| Ronnie Aguilar (23) 
| Ronnie Aguilar (12) 
| Lenny Daniel (5) 
| Changhua County Stadium 
| 1-10
|-style="background:#fcc;"
| 12 
| January 28 
| Knights 
| L 74-105 
| Wu Sung-Wei (22) 
| Lenny Daniel (10) 
| Li Ping-Hung (3) 
| Changhua County Stadium 
| 1-11

|-style="background:#fcc;"
| 13 
| February 3 
| @Kung Fu 
| L 79-108 
| Erron Maxey (34) 
| Erron Maxey (13) 
| Chou Tzu-Hua (6) 
| Nanhai Gymnasium 
| 1-12
|-style="background:#fcc;"
| 14 
| February 11 
| @Slingers 
| L 65-72 
| Cameron Forte (26) 
| Cameron Forte (16) 
| Yang Tian-You (4) 
| OCBC Arena 
| 1-13
|-style="background:#fcc;"
| 15 
| February 18 
| @Alab 
| L 93-117 
| Cameron Forte (29) 
| Cameron Forte (21) 
| Chou Tzu-Hua (5) 
| City of Santa Rosa Multi-Purpose Complex 
| 1-14
|-style="background:#fcc;"
| 16 
| February 24 
| Eastern 
| L 91-93 
| Cameron Forte (31) 
| Ronnie Aguilar (13) 
| Yang Tian-You (5) 
| Changhua County Stadium 
| 1-15
|-style="background:#fcc;"
| 17 
| February 25 
| Dragons 
| L 92-95 
| Cameron Forte (42) 
| Cameron Forte (25) 
| Cameron Forte (5) 
| Changhua County Stadium 
| 1-16

|-style="background:#fcc;"
| 18 
| March 17 
| Kung Fu 
| L 83-105 
| Cameron Forte (33) 
| Cameron Forte (14) 
| Chien, Forte (2) 
| Changhua County Stadium 
| 1-17
|-style="background:#fcc;"
| 19 
| March 18 
| Slingers 
| L 69-87 
| Cameron Forte (20) 
| Cameron Forte (12) 
| Cameron Forte (4) 
| Changhua County Stadium 
| 1-18
|-style="background:#fcc;"
| 20 
| March 22 
| @Eastern 
| L 93-99 
| Yang Tian-You (25) 
| Cameron Forte (15) 
| Yang Tian-You (6) 
| Southorn Stadium 
| 1-19

Player Statistics 
<noinclude>

 Reference：
‡ Waived during the season
≠ Acquired during the season

Transactions

Overview

Free Agency

Additions

Subtractions

Awards

Players of the Week

Local players

World imports

References 

Formosa Dreamers seasons
Formosa Dreamers Season, 2017-18